The Ogonek-class river patrol craft, also known as Project 12130 Ogoniok river gunboat, is a Russian Coast Guard vessel. The patrol craft is designed to operate in rivers and perform various missions of the Russian Coast Guard like protecting Russian maritime borders, law enforcement, enforcement of navigation rules, search and rescue, and fisheries protection.

Design
The patrol craft are designed similar to other Russian river patrol vessels. In terms of armament, PSKR-201, 202 are only equipped with one 30 mm gun rather than two 30 mm guns and carry a 12.7 mm machine gun; all of the vessels carry the SAM system and the 7.62 mm machine gun. The suite of armaments they are equipped with allows the craft to engage surface, air, and ground threats and targets. The vessels are equipped with a simple navigational radar and communication systems. The vessels are equipped with 2 x 1100 hp M401B diesel engines, two fixed pitch propellers, 2 x 30 kW diesel generators; this gives them a top speed of about 25 knots.

See also
List of ships of Russia by project number

References

Patrol vessels of Russia
Patrol boat classes